Falls of Cruachan is a waterfall of Scotland.

See also
Waterfalls of Scotland

References

Waterfalls of Argyll and Bute